2-Pyridylethylamine is a histamine agonist which is selective for the H1 subtype.

References

Amines
Histamine agonists
2-Pyridyl compounds